Galletti is a surname. Notable people with the surname include:

 Alessio Galletti, Italian racing cyclist
 Arthur Galletti (1877–1967), British Indian civil servant
 Carlo Galletti, Italian footballer
 Filippo Maria Galletti, Italian painter
 Giacomo Galletti, Bishop of Alessano
 Gian Luca Galletti, Italian politician
 Giovanna Galletti, Italian actress
 Giulio Galletti, Bishop of Alessano
  
 Luciano Galletti, retired Argentine footballer
 Paolo Galletti, Italian swimmer
 Pietro Luigi Galletti, Italian historian
 Rubén Horacio Galletti, Argentine footballer

See also
 Galletti, a type of cracker from Malta which forms part of Maltese cuisine